Francisco Mariano Nipho (1719 in Alcañiz – 1803 in Madrid) was a Spanish writer and journalist.

Nicknamed the "freak of nature", he is regarded in Spain as one of the best journalists of all time. During the reign of Charles III, he established himself as the founder of modern journalism and the first professional journalist. Born Francisco Manuel Mariano Nipho in Alcaniz, as a young boy his family moved to Madrid where he grew up, worked, and lived the rest of his life.

Nipho founded a number of newspapers that went under different pseudonyms such as, "Mariano de la Say" and "Manuel Ruiz de Uribe". Nipho’s work highlighted the artistic and social responsibility of journalism, but did not benefit him economically. He said that journalism was "a painful and unprofitable occupation", but that the real task of journalism is to "educate and moralize." Like many European journalists of the period, he made extensive use of translation, and may be credited with publishing the earliest known direct English-to-Spanish translations of a literary text.

It was not until his later years when he would begin to establish himself economically and professionally, serving as a censor in the late 18th century.

Modern conception of journalism
Nipho believed that books was out of reach of the general public and so it was necessary for newspaper circulation to be a critical source for the culturalization of society. Their newspapers rather than pure news and scholarly were critical, but always looking for popularization to try and connect with readers.

With a criterion traditional and Christian, intended to convey new knowledge of the enlightened minority to the rest of the country, although the rationalism of the time conflicted with their religious beliefs. In any case, theocentric vision remained intact. Nipho left several ideas about his approach to journalism. It must contain three fundamental notes: range, accuracy and speed. He had to report a profit immediately, in this case, the recovery of the Spanish economy. The journalist must meet two objectives: education and development of science.

Era and influences
The circumstances of the eighteenth century greatly influenced Nipho. It was a time when Enlightenment ideas were prevailing. The picture had great zeal for reform and were supported by the monarchy. They had an entrepreneurial spirit. However, his reform measures could not match the true desires of the country. Some traditionalists opposed sectors and transformations developed slowly. The problems at the time in Spain (poverty, low social mobility) made Charles III along with politicians and intellectuals carry out a number of improvements. This was attempted while reducing the power of the nobility supported by the bourgeoisie. Therefore, the reforms did not arrive by the revolutionary way.

Journalism
Nipho output was varied and numerous, but all of it reflects his view that the newspaper is a communication medium that reaches the masses, unlike the book which he says is not affordable for a large segment of the population. Other publications: The Fair Whisperer. Nipho applied in its satirical sense moralizing with a purpose and a literary critic, social customs and, based on its concern about the continuing process of de-Christianization of society. He divided the work into different letters explaining the behavior of England in different customs, arts, etc. It was directed by Nipho under the name of "Mariano of Giga". The Mail General, History, Literary and Economic Europe collect useful reports on different countries. It was published weekly, and was distributed in England and several European countries.

The Court Jester
A satirical writing was published under the pseudonym "Joseph de la Serna". Its purpose was to laugh at what deserved laughter and get serious with the nonsense. Therefore it appears markedly with social criticism, ironic and bitter in a very varied.

Diario de Madrid
It was the first newspaper ever known Spain (1758). He used the pseudonym "Don Manuel Ruiz de Uribe", working with Juan Antonio Lozano. He could undertake this task with the privilege obtained by Ferdinand VI.

A figure in perspective
The life and work of Nipho shows clearly its fickle nature, which resulted in the times he abandoned several of his publications for one reason or another. However, he deserves praise for his innovative spirit and his desire to improve as a result of his own personality, love of journalism and the era in which he lived. We can find in his writings the manifestations of a deep critical. It is pessimistic because of the de-Christianization and demoralization that crossed the Spanish society. This pessimistic view is what generates the desire to fix and improve. He showed that journalism was an art for him a great social responsibility, although it was little compensation.

Nipho caused an evolution in journalism: daily newspaper, political press, press moralizing and customs, as well as perfecting the known literary scholars newspapers. Along with the daily newspaper, brings establishing underwriting and commercial information or advertising. Also selling newspapers on the street as conceived today.
The Journal Noticioso

The first two copies were named: Daily News bulletins Curious-Scholar Public and Commercial and Economic. He had a long life, until 1918. Nipho created in 1758 the first publication of a daily basis in the history of Spanish journalism. Many previous papers had the name "daily" because reporting of events in chronological order by day. Noticioso Journal is coupled with the Censor and The Thinker, the three biggest newspapers in the second half of the eighteenth century in Spain. In 1759 Nipho sheds its part of this company, and sells it to his partner, Juan Antonio Lozano, who continues to publish the newspaper until his death in 1780. In Noticioso Journal ads are inserted "for nothing". Birth of the "Warning" in Spain, which concludes the "Plan" newspaper. Nipho explained:

"Many individuals advised me to give the notices, which are determined for the Journal from eight to eight days, or at most twice a week, but I have not been able to accommodate this idea, for a very strong reason is that many Sometimes there is a person in this courtroom who has commissioned accuracy or buy some things for themselves, or for people in their place: this guy is a day in court and not the entire week, with that for it, if it does not come or be in Madrid on the day of publication of the Journal, he notices that will be slow to communicate or not timely. For this reason, you want to sell some jewelry or furniture, you may lose the stranger say a good purchased. But today has money who need it tomorrow, with that out every day of the Journal useful work all serve their ads. "

This publication had up to 1000 subscribers. In 1786, Jacques Thevin renamed by Diario de Madrid . Covering the local, the national front, which had no place in the official newspapers: the Gazette and Mercury.
References

References

Enciso Recio, Luis Miguel (1956). Nipho and eighteenth century Spanish journalism. National Research Council.  .

Spanish male writers
People from Alcañiz
1719 births
1803 deaths